The Libertarian Party of Canada is a federal political party in Canada founded in 1973. The party subscribes to classical liberal tenets, and its mission is to reduce the size, scope, and cost of government. Party policies include ending drug prohibition, ending government censorship, lowering taxes, protecting gun rights, and non-interventionism.

History 
The party was founded on 7 July 1973 by Bruce Evoy (who became its first chairman) and seven others. Evoy ran unsuccessfully for election to Parliament in the 1974 federal election in the Toronto riding of Rosedale. The party achieved registered status in the 1979 federal election by running more than fifty candidates.

The party described itself as Canada's "fourth party" in the 1980s, but it has since been displaced by new parties such as the Bloc Québécois and the Green Party of Canada. The party declined to join the Reform Party of Canada when it was formed in 1987. Many Libertarians were also attracted to provincial Progressive Conservative parties that moved to the right during the 1990s in Ontario under Mike Harris and in Alberta under Ralph Klein. The decline in the party's membership and resources resulted in Elections Canada removing their status as a registered party immediately before the 1997 federal election when the party failed to run the minimum fifty candidates needed to maintain its registration.

Jean-Serge Brisson led the party from 22 May 2000 until 18 May 2008, when he was succeeded by Dennis Young. Young defeated outgoing party president Alan Mercer for the leadership. Savannah Linklater was elected deputy leader. In May 2011, Katrina Chowne was elected leader of the Libertarian Party. In May 2014, Tim Moen was elected leader of the Libertarian Party.

In the 2015 federal election, the party fielded 72 candidates and solidified their position as the 6th federal party in Canada, with growth over 500% from the 2011 federal election.

The next Federal Libertarian Party of Canada Convention took place in Ottawa from 5 July through 7 July 2018, concluding on the 45th anniversary of the party.

In September 2018, Moen, who had previously offered the leadership of the Libertarian Party to Maxime Bernier, stated that he was open to the idea of a merger with Bernier's People's Party of Canada. When asked by Global News, Bernier indicated he had no interest in a merger.

Election results 

The party also nominated a number of candidates to run in by-elections:
 1980 by-election: 1
 1981 by-election: 1
 1982 by-election: 1
 1990 by-election: 2
 1995 by-election: 1
 2008 by-election: 1
 2010 by-election: 1
 2012 by-election: 3
 2013 by-election: 3
 2014 by-election: 2
 2016 by-election: 1
 2017 by-election: 4

 Sources
 Libertarian Party of Canada News (July/August 1974). 4. 1979-2006. "Parliament of Canada History of the Federal Electoral Ridings since 1867".

Leaders

See also 

 British Columbia Libertarian Party
 Libertarian Party of Canada candidates in the 1988 Canadian federal election
 Libertarian Party of Canada candidates in the 1993 Canadian federal election
 Libertarian Party of Canada candidates in the 2006 Canadian federal election
 Libertarian Party of Canada candidates in the 2008 Canadian federal election
 Libertarian Party of Canada candidates in the 2011 Canadian federal election
 Libertarian Party of Canada candidates in the 2015 Canadian federal election
 Libertarian Party of Manitoba
 Ontario Libertarian Party

References

External links 
  (in English).
 Libertarian Party of Canada – Canadian Political Parties and Political Interest Groups. Web archive created by the University of Toronto Libraries.

 
1973 establishments in Ontario
Classical liberal parties
Federal political parties in Canada
Libertarianism in Canada
Libertarian parties
Non-interventionist parties
Organizations based in Ottawa
Political parties established in 1973